Dogs of War may refer to:

Literature
"The dogs of war" (phrase), a phrase from the play Julius Caesar by William Shakespeare
The Dogs of War (novel), a 1974 novel by Frederick Forsyth
Dogs of War (comics), a 1994 series published by Defiant
Dogs of War, an anthology of short stories edited by David Drake
The Dogs of War (comics), a supervillain duo
Dogs of War, a 2017 novel by Adrian Tchaikovsky

Film
Dogs of War! (film), a 1923 short film in the Our Gang series
The Dogs of War (film), a 1980 film based on the Forsyth novel
War Dogs (2016 film), an American film directed by Todd Phillips

Television
"The Dogs of War" (Star Trek: Deep Space Nine), an episode of Star Trek: Deep Space Nine
"The Dogs of War" (The West Wing), an episode of The West Wing 
"Dogs of War", an episode of Wilfred

Gaming
Dogs of War (1989 video game), a run and gun game published in 1989
Dogs of War (2000 video game), a science fiction real-time strategy game
Dogs of War (Warhammer), several groups in the Warhammer universe
Medal of Honor: European Assault or Medal of Honor: Dogs of War, a first-person shooter video game

Music
Dogs of War (album), a 1995 album by Saxon, or the title song

Songs
"The Dogs of War" (song), a 1987 song by Pink Floyd
"Dogs of War", a song by The Exploited from Punks Not Dead
"Dogs of War", a song by Ghostface Killah from Fishscale
"Dogs of War", a song by Motörhead from Snake Bite Love
"Dogs of War", a song by The Sensational Alex Harvey Band from SAHB Stories
"Dogs of War", a song by Biohazard from New World Disorder
"Dogs of War", a song by AC/DC from Rock or Bust
"Dogs of War", a song by Blues Saraceno from the album Dark Country 3 by Various artists

Sport
Dogs of War, a nickname briefly attributed to Everton F.C., by former manager and player Joe Royle.
Dogs of War, a wrestling stable in the Raw brand consisting of Dolph Ziggler, Drew McIntyre, and Braun Strowman

Warfare
Mercenaries, soldiers who take part in a conflict for personal gain
Dogs in warfare, the use of dogs in combat

See also
War Dogs (disambiguation)
Hogs of War, a 2000 video game